These are achievements of play on Ladies European Tour events.

Individual scoring records

Winning scores

Lowest rounds

Hole-in-ones

Miscellaneous records

Consecutive wins

Wins in one season

See also
Champions Tour records
List of golfers with most Ladies European Tour wins

References

External links
Golf Today: Ladies European Tour statistics
Ladies European Tour official website 

Ladies European Tour
Golf records and rankings